Beaver Creek Massacre Site is located near Dolores, Colorado.  It was added to the National Register of Historic Places on October 2, 1986.

References

External links

 Article about the site

Conflict sites on the National Register of Historic Places in Colorado